Richard King (born 23 April 1973) is a New Zealand former cricketer. He played first-class cricket for Auckland, Central Districts and Otago between 1991 and 2003.

See also
 List of Otago representative cricketers
 List of Auckland representative cricketers

References

External links
 

1973 births
Living people
New Zealand cricketers
Auckland cricketers
Central Districts cricketers
Otago cricketers
Cricketers from Wellington City